Whyanbeel is a rural locality in the Shire of Douglas, Queensland, Australia.

Geography 
It is within the Daintree National Park.

The southern areas are watered by Whyanbeel Creek and its tributary Chinaman Creek. In the farming land there are cane tramways to transport the harvested sugarcane to the Mossman Sugar Mill.

History 
The name Whyanbeel means canoe in an Aboriginal language (possibly Yindinyji) and was recorded on 6 December 1873 by explorer George Elphinstone Dalrymple.

Education 
There are no schools in Whyanbeel. The nearest primary school is in neighbouring Miallo. The nearest secondary school is in Mossman.

References 

Shire of Douglas
Localities in Queensland